The Rapallo Carige Prize is an  Italian literary award, established in 1985 by the Municipality of Rapallo and the Carige Bank (Banca Carige).

The award is intended to promote writing by women and is open to new works by women writers in Italian. The winner receives 20,000 euros.

Recipients 
 1985 – Virginia Galante Garrone: L'ora del tempo (Garzanti)
 1986 – Giuliana Berlinguer: Una per sei (Comunia)
 1987 – Gina Lagorio: Golfo del paradiso (Garzanti)
 1988 – Rosetta Loy: Le strade di polvere (Einaudi)
 1989 – Edith Bruck: Lettera alla madre (Garzanti)
 1990 – Paola Capriolo: Il nocchiero Feltrinelli)
 1991 – Armanda Guiducci: Virginia e l'angelo (Longanesi)
 1992 – Susanna Tamaro: Per voce sola (Marsilio)
 1993 – Camilla Salvago Raggi: Prima del fuoco (Longanesi)
 1994 – Laura Mancinelli: Gli occhi dell'imperatore (Einaudi)
 1995 – Sandra Verda: Il male addosso (Bollati Boringhieri)
 1996 – Helga Schneider: Il rogo di Berlino (Adelphi)
 1997 – Francesca Duranti: Sogni Mancini (Rizzo)
 1998 – Romana Petri: Alle Case Venie (Marsilio)
 1999 – Anna Maria Mori and Nelida Milani: Bora (Frassinelli)
 2000 – Renata Pisu: La via della Cina (Sperling & Kupfer)
 2001 – Paola Mastrocola: La gallina volante (Guanda)
 2002 – Margaret Mazzantini: Non ti muovere (Mondadori)
 2003 – Francesca Marciano: Casa Rossa (Longanesi)
 2004 – Francesca Duranti: L'ultimo viaggio della Canaria (Marsilio)
 2005 – Patrizia Bisi: Daimon (Einaudi)
 2006 – Silvia Ballestra: La Seconda Dora (Rizzoli)
 2007 – Brunella Schisa: La donna in nero (Garzanti)
 2008 – Caterina Bonvicini, L'equilibrio degli squali (Garzanti)
 2009 – Daria Bignardi, Non vi lascerò orfani (Mondadori)
 2010 – Benedetta Cibrario, Sotto cieli noncuranti (Feltrinelli)
 2011 – Federica Manzon, Di fama e di sventura (Mondadori)
 2012 – Francesca Melandri, Più alto del mare (Rizzoli)
 2013 – Emanuela Abbadessa, Capo Scirocco (Rizzoli)
 2014 – Emmanuelle de Villepin,  La vita che scorre (Longanesi)
 2015 – Valentina D'Urbano, Quella vita che ci manca (Longanesi)
 2016 – Sara Rattaro, Splendi più che puoi (Garzanti)
 2017 – Anilda Ibrahimi, Il tuo nome è una promessa (Einaudi)
 2018 – Rosella Postorino, Le assaggiatrici (Feltrinelli)
 2019 – Cinzia Leone, Ti rubo la vita (Mondadori)
 2020 – Simona Vinci, Mai più sola nel bosco (Marsilio)
 2021 – Ilaria Tuti, Fiore di roccia (Longanesi)

See also

 List of literary awards honoring women

References

External links 
  Le Vincitrici delle scorse edizioni web site Banca Carige

Italian literary awards
Fiction awards
Literary awards honoring women
Awards established in 1985
1985 establishments in Italy
Rapallo